The 2019–20 New Orleans Pelicans season was the 18th season of the New Orleans Pelicans franchise in the National Basketball Association (NBA). On April 17, 2019, the Pelicans named David Griffin the executive vice president of basketball operations. On May 14, the Pelicans won the top draft choice, making it the second time in franchise history they won the lottery. Five days later, the Pelicans named former Brooklyn Nets assistant general manager Trajan Langdon their newest general manager, replacing interim general manager Danny Ferry.

This was the first season since 2011-12 that long-time power forward Anthony Davis was not on the roster, as he was traded to the Los Angeles Lakers for Brandon Ingram, Lonzo Ball, Josh Hart, 3 future first round draft picks, and the right to swap first round picks with the Lakers in 2023, on June 15, 2019. With the Lakers, Davis, along with LeBron James would go on to lead the Lakers to their 17th championship title and the franchise's first in the post-Kobe Bryant era. Five days trading Davis, on June 20, the Pelicans selected Duke phenom Zion Williamson first overall in the 2019 NBA Draft, and due to an injury, he wouldn't play his first professional game until January 23, 2020, where in a game vs the San Antonio Spurs, he had dropped 22 points in just 18 minutes during the 4th quarter.

The season was suspended by the league officials following the games of March 11 after it was reported that Rudy Gobert tested positive for COVID-19. On June 4, the Pelicans were named as one of the 22 teams heading to the  NBA Bubble at Walt Disney World's ESPN Wide World of Sports Complex for the continuation of the NBA season. The Pelicans failed to qualify for the postseason for the second consecutive season following a loss to the San Antonio Spurs along with a win by the Trail Blazers over the Philadelphia 76ers on the same day. It was also the first time that shooting guard JJ Redick missed the playoffs for the first time in his career.

Draft

The Pelicans will hold the first pick in the draft this year due to them winning the NBA draft lottery, along with two second-round draft picks. On June 15, the Pelicans agreed to a trade involving star forward/center Anthony Davis where, in exchange for a few of the Los Angeles Lakers' young, promising players, they also acquired a multitude of first-round draft picks, one of which includes the fourth selection of this year's draft. However, the trade was not be finalized until July 6. On the night of the draft, the Pelicans agreed to a deal with the Atlanta Hawks, where they would give up the Lakers' fourth pick of the draft (which became De'Andre Hunter from the University of Virginia), their 57th pick, a future second-round pick, and Solomon Hill in exchange for Picks 8, 17, and 35. Just like their trade with the Lakers, however, this trade wasn't finalized until July 6.

With the #1 of the draft, New Orleans selected star power forward Zion Williamson from Duke University. In his only season in Duke, Williamson earned many honors and awards for his play, including the consensus National College Player of the Year. With the 39th pick, the Pelicans acquired Serbian power forward Alen Smailagić from the Santa Cruz Warriors in the NBA G League, but traded him to the Golden State Warriors for two future second-round picks and cash considerations. With the 57th pick, the Pelicans selected point guard Jordan Bone from the University of Tennessee. He would end up being traded to the Detroit Pistons after multiple trades.

Roster

Standings

Division

Conference

Game log

Preseason 

|- style="background:#cfc;"
| 1
| October 7
| @ Atlanta
| 
| Jrue Holiday (21)
| Zion Williamson (7)
| Lonzo Ball (7)
| State Farm Arena15,441
| 1–0
|- style="background:#cfc;"
| 2
| October 9
| @ Chicago
| 
| Zion Williamson (29)
| Derrick Favors (9)
| Lonzo Ball (9)
| United Center18,670
| 2–0
|- style="background:#cfc;"
| 3
| October 11
| Utah
| 
| Zion Williamson (26)
| Brandon Ingram (6)
| Nickeil Alexander-Walker (4)
| Smoothie King Center17,954
| 3–0
|- style="background:#cfc;"
| 4
| October 13
| @ San Antonio
| 
| Zion Williamson (22)
| Zion Williamson (10)
| Nickeil Alexander-Walker (7)
| AT&T Center12,101
| 4–0
|- style="background:#cfc;"
| 5
| October 18
| @ New York
| 
| Alexander-Walker, Hart (7)
| Jahlil Okafor (9)
| Moore, Holiday (4)
| Madison Square Garden19,812
| 5–0

Regular season 

|- style="background:#fcc;"
| 1
| October 22
| @ Toronto
| 
| Brandon Ingram (22)
| Josh Hart (10)
| Jrue Holiday (6)
| Scotiabank Arena20,787
| 0–1
|- style="background:#fcc;"
| 2
| October 25
| Dallas
| 
| Brandon Ingram (25)
| Josh Hart (9)
| Jrue Holiday (8)
| Smoothie King Center17,027
| 0–2
|- style="background:#fcc;"
| 3
| October 26
| @ Houston
| 
| Brandon Ingram (35)
| Brandon Ingram (15)
| Lonzo Ball (10)
| Toyota Center18,055
| 0–3
|- style="background:#fcc;"
| 4
| October 28
| Golden State
| 
| Brandon Ingram (27)
| Brandon Ingram (10)
| Lonzo Ball (9)
| Smoothie King Center17,307
| 0–4
|- style="background:#cfc;"
| 5
| October 31
| Denver
| 
| Jahlil Okafor (26)
| Okafor, Holiday, Hart, Alexander-Walker (5)
| Lonzo Ball (8)
| Smoothie King Center16,613
| 1–4

|- style="background:#fcc;"
| 6
| November 2
| @ Oklahoma City
| 
| JJ Redick (17)
| Josh Hart (15)
| Lonzo Ball (7)
| Chesapeake Energy Arena18,203
| 1–5
|- style="background:#fcc;"
| 7
| November 4
| @ Brooklyn
| 
| Brandon Ingram (40)
| Hart, Holiday (7)
| Brandon Ingram (5)
| Barclays Center17,194
| 1–6
|- style="background:#fcc;"
| 8
| November 8
| Toronto
| 
| Brandon Ingram (27)
| Derrick Favors (10)
| Jrue Holiday (6)
| Smoothie King Center16,337
| 1–7
|- style="background:#cfc;"
| 9
| November 9
| @ Charlotte
| 
| Brandon Ingram (25)
| Derrick Favors (10)
| Jrue Holiday (11)
| Spectrum Center18,513
| 2–7
|- style="background:#fcc;"
| 10
| November 11
| Houston
| 
| JJ Redick (24)
| Derrick Favors (12)
| Jrue Holiday (11)
| Smoothie King Center16,695
| 2–8
|- style="background:#cfc;"
| 11
| November 14
| L. A. Clippers
| 
| Jrue Holiday (36)
| Derrick Favors (20)
| Jrue Holiday (7)
| Smoothie King Center17,147
| 3–8
|- style="background:#fcc;"
| 12
| November 16
| @ Miami
| 
| Nickeil Alexander-Walker (27)
| Melli, Williams (5)
| E'Twaun Moore (5)
| American Airlines Arena19,600
| 3–9
|- style="background:#cfc;"
| 13
| November 17
| Golden State
| 
| JJ Redick (26)
| Hayes, Williams (10)
| Jrue Holiday (9)
| Smoothie King Center16,812
| 4–9
|- style="background:#cfc;"
| 14
| November 19
| Portland
| 
| Jrue Holiday (22)
| Kenrich Williams (13)
| Jrue Holiday (10)
| Smoothie King Center15,021
| 5–9
|- style="background:#cfc;"
| 15
| November 21
| @ Phoenix
| 
| Brandon Ingram (28)
| Kenrich Williams (9)
| Jrue Holiday (9)
| Talking Stick Resort Arena13,903
| 6–9
|- style="background:#fcc;"
| 16
| November 23
| @ Utah
| 
| Brandon Ingram (33)
| JJ Redick (7)
| Brandon Ingram (5)
| Vivint Smart Home Arena18,306
| 6–10
|- style="background:#fcc;"
| 17
| November 24
| @ L. A. Clippers
| 
| Brandon Ingram (24)
| Brandon Ingram (8)
| Ingram, Ball (5)
| Staples Center19,068
| 6–11
|- style="background:#fcc;"
| 18
| November 27
| L. A. Lakers
| 
| Jrue Holiday (29)
| Brandon Ingram (10)
| Jrue Holiday (12)
| Smoothie King Center18,626
| 6–12
|- style="background:#fcc;"
| 19
| November 29
| @ Oklahoma City
| 
| Brandon Ingram (26)
| Brandon Ingram (8)
| Jrue Holiday (6)
| Chesapeake Energy Arena18,203
| 6–13

|- style="background:#fcc;"
| 20
| December 1
| Oklahoma City
| 
| Jrue Holiday (26)
| Josh Hart (11)
| Lonzo Ball (7)
| Smoothie King Center15,427
| 6–14
|- style="background:#fcc;"
| 21
| December 3
| Dallas
| 
| Brandon Ingram (24)
| Hayes, Melli (8)
| Brandon Ingram (6)
| Smoothie King Center14,664
| 6–15
|- style="background:#fcc;"
| 22
| December 5
| Phoenix
| 
| JJ Redick (26)
| Jrue Holiday (7)
| Lonzo Ball (11)
| Smoothie King Center15,607
| 6–16
|- style="background:#fcc;"
| 23
| December 7
| @ Dallas
| 
| JJ Redick (15)
| Jaxson Hayes (5)
| Jrue Holiday (4)
| American Airlines Center19,456
| 6–17
|- style="background:#fcc;"
| 24
| December 9
| Detroit
| 
| Brandon Ingram (31)
| Kenrich Williams (8)
| Hart, Holiday (5)
| Smoothie King Center13,694
| 6–18
|- style="background:#fcc;"
| 25
| December 11
| @ Milwaukee
| 
| JJ Redick (31)
| Brandon Ingram (10)
| Ball, Holiday, Okafor (6)
| Fiserv Forum17,385
| 6–19
|- style="background:#fcc;"
| 26
| December 13
| @ Philadelphia
| 
| Brandon Ingram (32)
| Derrick Favors (8)
| Jrue Holiday (10)
| Wells Fargo Center20,620
| 6–20
|- style="background:#fcc;"
| 27
| December 15
| Orlando
| 
| Jrue Holiday (29)
| Jaxson Hayes (7)
| Jrue Holiday (8)
| Smoothie King Center15,388
| 6–21
|- style="background:#fcc;"
| 28
| December 17
| Brooklyn
| 
| Brandon Ingram (22)
| Brandon Ingram (10)
| Jrue Holiday (6)
| Smoothie King Center15,177
| 6–22
|- style="background:#cfc;"
| 29
| December 18
| @ Minnesota
| 
| Brandon Ingram (34)
| Derrick Favors (11)
| Lonzo Ball (6)
| Target Center12,490
| 7–22
|- style="background:#fcc;"
| 30
| December 20
| @ Golden State
| 
| Ingram, Holiday (25)
| Derrick Favors (10)
| Brandon Ingram (6)
| Chase Center18,064
| 7–23
|- style="background:#cfc;"
| 31
| December 23
| @ Portland
| 
| Jrue Holiday (21)
| Derrick Favors (13)
| Ingram, Holiday (5)
| Moda Center19,499
| 8–23
|- style="background:#cfc;"
| 32
| December 25
| @ Denver
| 
| Brandon Ingram (31)
| Derrick Favors (13)
| Favors, Holiday (8)
| Pepsi Center19,520
| 9–23
|- style="background:#cfc;"
| 33
| December 28
| Indiana
| 
| Brandon Ingram (31)
| Derrick Favors (16)
| Ingram, Holiday (7)
| Smoothie King Center15,391
| 10–23
|- style="background:#cfc;"
| 34
| December 29
| Houston
| 
| Ingram, Ball (27)
| Derrick Favors (16)
| Lonzo Ball (8)
| Smoothie King Center17,712
| 11–23

|- style="background:#fcc;"
| 35
| January 3
| @ L. A. Lakers
| 
| Lonzo Ball (23)
| Derrick Favors (14)
| Jrue Holiday (6)
| Staples Center18,997
| 11–24
|- style="background:#cfc;"
| 36
| January 4
| @ Sacramento
| 
| Lonzo Ball (24)
| Derrick Favors (11)
| Lonzo Ball (10)
| Golden 1 Center16,808
| 12–24
|- style="background:#fcc;"
| 37
| January 6
| Utah
| 
| Brandon Ingram (35)
| Derrick Favors (10)
| Lonzo Ball (7)
| Smoothie King Center14,138
| 12–25
|- style="background:#cfc;"
| 38
| January 8
| Chicago
| 
| Brandon Ingram (29)
| Jaxson Hayes (12)
| Brandon Ingram (11)
| Smoothie King Center15,324
| 13–25
|- style="background:#cfc;"
| 39
| January 10
| @ New York
| 
| Brandon Ingram (28)
| Hart, Hayes (10)
| Lonzo Ball (11)
| Madison Square Garden18,003
| 14–25
|- style="background:#fcc;"
| 40
| January 11
| @ Boston
| 
| Frank Jackson (22)
| Lonzo Ball (13)
| Lonzo Ball (9)
| TD Garden19,156
| 14–26
|- style="background:#cfc;"
| 41
| January 13
| @ Detroit
| 
| Jahlil Okafor (25)
| Jahlil Okafor (14)
| Lonzo Ball (9)
| Little Caesars Arena13,780
| 15–26
|- style="background:#cfc;"
| 42
| January 16
| Utah
| 
| Brandon Ingram (49)
| Derrick Favors (11)
| Lonzo Ball (13)
| Smoothie King Center16,717
| 16–26
|- style="background:#fcc;"
| 43
| January 18
| L. A. Clippers
| 
| Derrick Favors (22)
| Derrick Favors (11)
| Lonzo Ball (11)
| Smoothie King Center17,959
| 16–27
|- style="background:#cfc;"
| 44
| January 20
| @ Memphis
| 
| Jrue Holiday (36)
| Lonzo Ball (9)
| Brandon Ingram (6)
| FedExForum17,794
| 17–27
|- style="background:#fcc;"
| 45
| January 22
| San Antonio
| 
| Ingram, 
| Derrick Favors (10)
| Lonzo Ball (12)
| Smoothie King Center18,365
| 17–28
|- style="background:#fcc;"
| 46
| January 24
| Denver
| 
| JJ Redick (18)
| Josh Hart (13)
| Jrue Holiday (9)
| Smoothie King Center16,398
| 17–29
|- style="background:#cfc;"
| 47
| January 26
| Boston
| 
| Jrue Holiday (25)
| Zion Williamson (11)
| Lonzo Ball (15)
| Smoothie King Center16,737
| 18–29
|- style="background:#cfc;"
| 48
| January 28
| @ Cleveland
| 
| Jrue Holiday (28)
| Zion Williamson (9)
| Jrue Holiday (8)
| Rocket Mortgage FieldHouse19,432
| 19–29
|- style="background:#cfc;"
| 49
| January 31
| Memphis
| 
| Zion Williamson (24)
| Josh Hart (11)
| Lonzo Ball (8)
| Smoothie King Center18,362
| 20–29

|- style="background:#fcc;"
| 50
| February 2
| @ Houston
| 
| Brandon Ingram (28)
| Brandon Ingram (12)
| Lonzo Ball (9)
| Toyota Center18,055
| 20–30
|- style="background:#fcc"
| 51
| February 4
| Milwaukee
| 
| Brandon Ingram (32)
| Lonzo Ball (14)
| Holiday, Williamson (5)
| Smoothie King Center15,424
| 20–31
|- style="background:#cfc;"
| 52
| February 6
| @ Chicago
| 
| Zion Williamson (21)
| Derrick Favors (15)
| Lonzo Ball (10)
| United Center18,247
| 21–31
|- style="background:#cfc;"
| 53
| February 8
| @ Indiana
| 
| Jrue Holiday (31)
| Derrick Favors (11)
| Jrue Holiday (10)
| Bankers Life Fieldhouse17,923
| 22–31
|- style="background:#cfc;"
| 54
| February 11
| Portland
| 
| Zion Williamson (31)
| Melli, Williamson (9)
| Ball, Holiday (10)
| Smoothie King Center15,739
| 23–31
|- style="background:#fcc;"
| 55
| February 13
| Oklahoma City
| 
| Zion Williamson (32)
| Derrick Favors (9)
| Jrue Holiday (11)
| Smoothie King Center17,865
| 23–32
|- style="background:#cfc;"
| 56
| February 21
| @ Portland
| 
| Zion Williamson (25)
| Josh Hart (13)
| Jrue Holiday (9)
| Moda Center19,946
| 24–32
|- style="background:#cfc;"
| 57
| February 23
| @ Golden State
| 
| Zion Williamson (28)
| Derrick Favors (11)
| Jrue Holiday (15)
| Chase Center18,064
| 25–32
|- style="background:#fcc;"
| 58
| February 25
| @ L. A. Lakers
| 
| Brandon Ingram (34)
| Lonzo Ball (8)
| Jrue Holiday (9)
| Staples Center18,997
| 25–33
|- style="background:#cfc;"
| 59
| February 28
| Cleveland
| 
| Brandon Ingram (29)
| Derrick Favors (15)
| Lonzo Ball (12)
| Smoothie King Center18,304
| 26–33

|- style="background:#fcc;"
| 60
| March 1
| L. A. Lakers
| 
| Zion Williamson (35)
| Derrick Favors (14)
| Lonzo Ball (9)
| Smoothie King Center18,547
| 26–34
|- style="background:#fcc;"
| 61
| March 3
| Minnesota
| 
| Jrue Holiday (27)
| Jrue Holiday (10)
| Jrue Holiday (12)
| Smoothie King Center15,264
| 26–35
|- style="background:#fcc;"
| 62
| March 4
| @ Dallas
| 
| Brandon Ingram (27)
| Derrick Favors (14)
| Ball, Holiday (6)
| American Airlines Center20,459
| 26–36
|- style="background:#cfc;"
| 63
| March 6
| Miami
| 
| Jrue Holiday (20)
| Josh Hart (12)
| Lonzo Ball (8)
| Smoothie King Center18,384
| 27–36
|- style="background:#cfc;"
| 64
| March 8
| @ Minnesota
| 
| Jrue Holiday (37)
| Brandon Ingram (12)
| Ball, Holiday (8)
| Target Center18,978
| 28–36

|- style="background:#fcc;"
| 65
| July 30
| Utah
| 
| Brandon Ingram (23)
| Favors, Ingram (8)
| Lonzo Ball (7)
| HP Field HouseNo In-Person Attendance
|28–37
|- style="background:#fcc;"
| 66
| August 1
| @ L. A. Clippers
| 
| Nickeil Alexander-Walker (15)
| Derrick Favors (9)
| Frank Jackson (6)
| HP Field HouseNo In-Person Attendance
| 28–38
|- style="background:#cfc;"
| 67
| August 3
| Memphis
| 
| Brandon Ingram (24)
| Derrick Favors (13)
| Lonzo Ball (6)
| HP Field HouseNo In-Person Attendance
| 29–38
|- style="background:#fcc;"
| 68
| August 6
| @ Sacramento
| 
| Ingram, Williamson (24)
| Jrue Holiday (5)
| Lonzo Ball (11)
| HP Field HouseNo In-Person Attendance
| 29–39
|- style="background:#cfc;"
| 69
| August 7
| Washington
| 
| Jrue Holiday (28)
| Derrick Favors (10)
| Jrue Holiday (6)
| Visa Athletic CenterNo In-Person Attendance
| 30–39
|- style="background:#fcc;"
| 70
| August 9
| San Antonio
| 
| JJ Redick (31)
| Derrick Favors (12)
| Lonzo Ball (10) 
| HP Field HouseNo In-Person Attendance
| 30–40
|- style="background:#fcc;"
| 71
| August 11
| @ Sacramento
| 
| Jahlil Okafor (21)
| Josh Hart (10)
| Nickeil Alexander-Walker (6)
| The ArenaNo In-Person Attendance
| 30–41
|- style="background:#fcc;"
| 72
| August 13
| @ Orlando
| 
| Frank Jackson (31)
| Josh Hart (14)
| Nickeil Alexander-Walker (7)
| Visa Athletic CenterNo In-Person Attendance
| 30–42

|- style="background:#;"
| 65
| March 11
| @ Sacramento
| 
|
|
|
| Golden 1 Center
|
|- style="background:#;"
| 66
| March 13
| @ Utah
| 
|
|
|
| Vivint Smart Home Arena
|
|- style="background:#;"
| 67
| March 14
| @ LA Clippers
| 
|
|
|
| Staples Center
|
|- style="background:#;"
| 68
| March 16
| Atlanta
| 
|
|
|
| Smoothie King Center
|
|- style="background:#;"
| 69
| March 18
| San Antonio
| 
|
|
|
| Smoothie King Center
|
|- style="background:#;"
| 70
| March 21
| @ Memphis
| 
|
|
|
| FedExForum
|
|- style="background:#;"
| 71
| March 22
| Sacramento
| 
|
|
|
| Smoothie King Center
|
|- style="background:#;"
| 72
| March 24
| Memphis
| 
|
|
|
| Smoothie King Center
|
|- style="background:#;"
| 73
| March 27
| New York
| 
|
|
|
| Smoothie King Center
|
|- style="background:#;"
| 74
| March 29
| @ Orlando
| 
|
|
|
| Amway Center
|
|- style="background:#;"
| 75
| March 31
| @ Atlanta
| 
|
|
|
| State Farm Arena
|
|- style="background:#;"
| 76
| April 1
| @ Washington
| 
|
|
|
| Capital One Arena
|
|- style="background:#;"
| 77
| April 5
| @ San Antonio
| 
|
|
|
| AT&T Center
|
|- style="background:#;"
| 78
| April 7
| Charlotte
| 
|
|
|
| Smoothie King Center
|
|- style="background:#;"
| 79
| April 9
| Phoenix
| 
|
|
|
| Smoothie King Center
|
|- style="background:#;"
| 80
| April 11
| Philadelphia
| 
|
|
|
| Smoothie King Center
|
|- style="background:#;"
| 81
| April 13
| Washington
| 
|
|
|
| Smoothie King Center
|
|- style="background:#;"
| 82
| April 15
| @ San Antonio
| 
|
|
|
| AT&T Center
|

Transactions

References

New Orleans Pelicans
New Orleans Pelicans seasons
New Orleans Pelicans